Hana Martínková (born 16 September 1985) is a Czech handball player for Baník Most and the Czech national team.

References

1985 births
Living people
Czech female handball players